Tetraberlinia tubmaniana is a species of plant in the family Fabaceae. It is found only in Liberia. The tree is harvested from the wild for its wood, which is used locally and also traded. The species is especially interesting for forestry because of the high densities in which it occurs. In old stands the exploitable timber per hectare can be as high as 70 cubic metres.

References

Further reading
Monopetalanthus exit. A systematic study of Bananaman, Bikinia, Icuria, Michelsonia and Tetraberlinia. Publication Wageningen Agricultural University Papers 99-4 Author Wieringa J.J. Publisher Wageningen University; Holland Year 1999  Description A university thesis, it is a revision of the genus Monopetalanthus and related genera with a very good description of the species, including known uses.

Detarioideae
Endemic flora of Liberia
Vulnerable flora of Africa
Taxonomy articles created by Polbot